María Irene Fornés (May 14, 1930 – October 30, 2018) was a Cuban-American playwright, theater director, and teacher who worked in off-Broadway and experimental theater venues in the last four decades of the twentieth century. Her plays range widely in subject-matter, but often depict characters with aspirations that belie their disadvantages. Fornés, who went by the name "Irene", received nine Obie Theatre Awards in various categories and was a finalist for the Pulitzer Prize in Drama for 1990.

New Yorker critic Hilton Als wrote in 2010 that she had done "more than her fair share in terms of changing the face of theatre". He added: "No matter how hard Fornés's subjects can be, her work sits in the ear like luxurious reason." In a 2013 interview, Tony Kushner said: "She had terrifyingly high standards and was terribly blunt about what others did with her work. Her productions were unforgettable. She was really a magical maker of theater."

Biography

Early years 
Fornés was born on May 14, 1930, in Havana, Cuba, the youngest of six children. After her father Carlos Fornés died in 1945, she immigrated to the United States at the age of 15 with her mother and one sister. She became a U.S. citizen in 1951. When she first arrived in the US, Fornés worked in the Capezio shoe factory. Dissatisfied, she took classes to learn English and became a translator. At the age of 19, she became interested in painting and began her formal education in abstract art, studying with Hans Hofmann in New York City and Provincetown, Massachusetts.

By 1954, Fornés had met the writer and artist's model Harriet Sohmers. They became lovers and moved to Paris where Fornés planned to study painting. There she was struck by the world premiere production of Samuel Beckett's Waiting for Godot. She later told an interviewer: "I didn't speak any French at all. But I understood the world in which it took place, I got the rhythm. And it turned my life upside down." She lived with Sohmers in Paris for three years, and after their relationship ended Fornés returned to New York City in 1957.

Early writing 
Fornés's first step toward playwriting involved translating letters she brought with her from Cuba that were written to her great-grandfather from a cousin in Spain. She turned the letters into a play called La Viuda (The Widow, 1961). Never translated into English, it premiered in Spanish in New York. She never staged the play herself, and it is considered "a precursor" to her work as a playwright.

In 1959, about the time she was working on La Viuda, Fornés entered into a romantic relationship with the writer Susan Sontag. Fornés later described how, in the spring of 1961, her career as a playwright was launched when she tried to help Sontag, who was frustrated by her inability to make progress on a novel she was writing. Fornés, by her own account, demonstrated how easy writing can be by sitting at their kitchen table and taking cues found at random in a cookbook to start a short story: "I might never have thought of writing if I hadn't pretended I was going to show Susan how easy it was." Their relationship ended in 1963.

Playwright
The play considered her first as a playwright was There! You Died, first produced by San Francisco's Actor's Workshop in 1963. An absurdist two-character play, it was later renamed Tango Palace and produced in 1964 at New York City's Actors Studio. The piece is an allegorical power struggle between the two central characters: Isidore, a clown, and Leopold, a naive youth. Like much of her writing, Tango Palace stresses character rather than plot. With it, Fornés also established her production style, which required her participation in the entire staging process.

The Successful Life of 3 and Promenade followed in 1965. The pair earned Fornés her first Obie Award in 1965. Both of the New York Times senior theater critics were enthusiastic in their reviews of Promenade. Clive Barnes called it "a joy from start to finish" and praised the show's "dexterity, wit and compassion". Walter Kerr highlighted the collaboration of lyricist and composer along with the show's manipulation of stereotypes and Brechtian juxtapositions that left him admiring the mockery of conventions that evoked affection for those same conventions: "The tenderness is as actual as the slyness.... Inside a put-on, some old pleasures have been restored."

She came close to having her work performed on Broadway in April 1966, when Jerome Robbins directed The Office starring Elaine May. But Fornes was so unhappy with how the production misrepresented her vision that she exercised her contractual right to withdraw the script. The show closed after ten previews and she never approached Broadway again.

In Fefu and Her Friends (1977), Fornés begins and ends with the audience seated as a single group facing a traditional stage. But she also experimented with deconstructing the stage by setting scenes in four locations simultaneously and having the audience, divided into four groups, view each scene in turn. The scenes repeat until each group has seen all four scenes. First produced by the New York Theater Strategy at the Relativity Media Lab, the play's eight women gather to plan a fundraising presentation, real women engaged in a banal activity. The play is considered to be feminist by critics and scholars, in that it offers a woman's perspective on female characters and their thoughts, feelings, and relationships. Fornés called it "a pro-feminine play rather than a feminist play", while one critic praises its exploration of the possibilities and risks of women's friendships.

In 1982, Fornés earned a special Obie for Sustained Achievement; in 1984, she received two Obies for writing and for directing three of her own plays: The Danube (1982), Mud (1983), and Sarita (1984). Mud, first produced in 1983 at the Padua Hills Playwright's Festival in California, explores the impoverished lives of Mae, Lloyd and Henry, who become involved in a love triangle. Fornés contrasts the desire to seek more in life with what is actually possible under given conditions. She described Mud as "a feminist play because the central character is a woman, and the theme is one that writers usually deal with through a male character.... It has nothing to do with men and women. It has to do with poverty and isolation and a mind. This mind is in the body of a female." Mud exemplifies Fornés' familiar technique of portraying a female character's rise opposed by male characters. The piece also explores the way the mind experiences poverty and isolation.

In Fornés' exploration of the world of Hispanic women in the US, the title character of Sarita begins in 1939 as a 13-year-old unwed mother in the South Bronx and at the end of the play enters a psychiatric hospital at the age of 21. Some dialogue is in Spanish as Sarita contends with the two men in her life, the exploitative Julio and her rescuer the Anglo Mark. Afro-Cuban religion and nostalgia for Cuba provide the drama's background. Distorted scenery in later scenes places Sarita in a context that reflects her psychological state.

The Conduct of Life (1985) was another Obie winner, as was  Abingdon Square (1988), both deemed Best New American Play. Fornés was also a finalist for the 1990 Pulitzer Prize for Drama with her play And What of the Night?

In 2000, Letters From Cuba had its premiere with the Signature Theatre Company in New York, which devoted its 1999-2000 season to her work. It was the last play she completed before health problems ended her writing career. For the first time, Fornés drew upon personal experience. She had exchanged letters with her own brother in Cuba for 30 years, and in the play a young man in Cuba reads from his letters to his sister, a dancer in New York. It lasts about an hour and is constructed of fragmentary moments, each scene just long enough to establish a mood. The heartache of separation is juxtaposed with the struggle of young artists and the ending offers an ecstatic resolution. Letters From Cuba was recognized by the Obie Awards with a special citation for Fornés.

Teaching and influence
In August 2018, as Fornes' death neared, a 12-hour marathon performance of excerpts from her works was staged at New York's Public Theater.

Fornés became a recognized force in both Hispanic-American and experimental theatre in New York. Her greatest influence may have come through her legendary playwriting workshops, which she taught to aspiring writers across the globe. Locally in New York City, as the director of the INTAR Hispanic Playwrights-in-Residence Lab in the 1980s and early '90s, she mentored a generation of Latin playwrights, including Cherríe Moraga, Migdalia Cruz, Nilo Cruz, Caridad Svich, and Eduardo Machado.

Pulitzer Prize-winning writers Tony Kushner, Paula Vogel, Lanford Wilson, Sam Shepard, and Edward Albee credit Fornés as an inspiration and influence. "Her work has no precedents; it isn't derived from anything," Lanford Wilson once said of her, "she's the most original of us all."  Paula Vogel contends: "In the work of every American playwright at the end of the 20th century, there are only two stages: before she has read Maria Irene Fornes and after." Tony Kushner concludes: "Every time I listen to Fornes, or read or see one of her plays, I feel this: she breathes, has always breathed, a finer, purer, sharper air."

At her death, Charles McNulty, theater critic of the Los Angeles Times, called her "the most influential American dramatist whose work hasn't become a staple of the mainstream repertoire" and added: "Although she was not as well-known as fellow theater maverick Sam Shepard, her playwriting exerted a similar magnetic pull on generations of theater artists inspired by her liberating example."

Personal life
Fornés was a lesbian and included gays and lesbians in several of her plays. She said, however, that she was not focused on examining such characters: "Being gay is not like being of another species. If you're gay, you're a person. What interests me is the mental and organic life of an individual. I'm writing about how people deal with things as an individual, not as a member of a type."

As Fornés' reputation grew in avant-garde circles, she became friendly with Norman Mailer and Joseph Papp and reconnected with Harriet Sohmers.

She was diagnosed with Alzheimer's disease in 2005 and lived the rest of her life in care facilities.
Fornés died at the Amsterdam Nursing Home in Manhattan on October 30, 2018.

Documentary and adaptations
A documentary feature about Fornés called The Rest I Make Up by Michelle Memran was made in collaboration with Fornés. It focuses on her creative life in the years after she stopped writing due to dementia. The film's title is a line from Promenade. It premiered at Doc Fortnight 2018, the annual festival of New York's Museum of Modern Art.

Philip Glass composed a 30-minute chamber opera for three singers accompanied by keyboard and harp based on Fornés' play Drowning.

Works 

 La Viuda (The Widow) (1961)
 There! You Died (1963) (produced as Tango Palace in 1964)
 The Successful Life of 3: A Skit for Vaudeville (1965)
 Promenade (music by Al Carmines) (1965)
 The Office (1966)
 The Annunciation (1967)
 A Vietnamese Wedding (1967)
 Dr. Kheal (1968)
 Molly's Dream (music by Cosmos Savage) (1968)
 The Red Burning Light, or Mission XQ3 (music by John Vauman) (1968)
 Aurora (music by John Fitzgibbon) (1972)
 The Curse of the Langston House (1972)
 Cap-a-Pie (From Head to Foot), in Spanish and English, music by José Raúl Bernardo) (1975)
 Washing (1976)
 Fefu and Her Friends (1977)
 Lolita in the Garden (1977)
 In Service (1978)
 Eyes on the Harem (1979)
 Evelyn Brown: A Diary (1980)
 A Visit (1981)
 The Danube (1982)

 Mud (1983)
 Sarita (music by Leon Odenz) (1984)
 No Time (1984)
 The Conduct of Life (1985)
 A Matter of Faith (1986)
 Lovers and Keepers (music by Tito Puente and Fernando Rivas) (1986)
 Drowning (adapted from a story by Chekhov) (1986)
 Art (1986)
 The Mothers (1986; revised as Nadine in 1989)
 Abingdon Square (1987)
 Hunger (1988)
 And What of the Night? (four one-act plays: Nadine, Springtime, Lust and Hunger) (1989)
 Oscar and Bertha (1992)
 Terra Incognita (an opera libretto with a piano score by Roberto Sierra, 90 minutes) (1992)
 Enter the Night (1993)
 Summer in Gossensass (1995)
 Manual for a Desperate Crossing (1996)
 Balseros (Rafters) (opera libretto based on Manual for a Desperate Crossing, music by Robert Ashley) (1997)
 Letters from Cuba (2000)

Direction, adaptation, and translation 
 Blood Wedding (translated and adapted Bodas de Sangre by Federico García Lorca) (1980)
 Life is a Dream (translated, adapted and directed La vida es sueño by Pedro Calderón de la Barca) (1981)
 Cold Air (translated, adapted and directed a play by Virgilio Piñera) (1985)
 Uncle Vanya (revised Marian Fell's translation of the play by Anton Chekhov and directed) (1987)

Awards and recognition 
 1961 John Hay Whitney Foundation fellowship 
 1965 Obie Award for Distinguished Plays: Promenade and The Successful Life of 3
 1972 Guggenheim Fellowship, Drama and Performance Art
 1977 Obie Award for Playwrighting: Fefu and Her Friends
 1979 Obie Award for Directing: Eyes on the Harem
 1982 Obie Award for Sustained Achievement
 1984 Obie Awards for Playwrighting: The Danube, Sarita, Mud
 1984 Obie Awards for Directing: The Danube, Sarita, Mud
 1985 Obie Award for Best New American Play: The Conduct of Life
 1985 American Academy and Institute of Arts and Letters award in literature
 1986 Playwrights U.S.A. Award for translation of Virgilio Piñera's Cold Air
 1988 Obie Award for Best New American Play: Abingdon Square
 1990 New York State Governor's Arts Award
 1992 Honorary doctorate, Bates College
 2000 Obie Award Special Citation for Letters From Cuba
 2001 Robert Chesley Award, for lifetime achievement
 2002 PEN/Laura Pels International Foundation for Theater Award for a Master American Dramatist

See also 

 Cuban American literature
 List of Cuban-American writers
 List of Cuban Americans

Notes

References

Further reading 
 
 
  statement by María Irene Fornés

External links

María Irene Fornés official website; archived March 20, 2007.
Fornés Institite
María Irene Fornés at Broadway Play Publishing Inc.
 

1930 births
2018 deaths
Cuban emigrants to the United States
Hispanic and Latino American dramatists and playwrights
American women dramatists and playwrights
American LGBT dramatists and playwrights
Cuban LGBT dramatists and playwrights
Cuban lesbian writers
LGBT Hispanic and Latino American people
American lesbian writers
Lesbian dramatists and playwrights
20th-century Cuban women writers
20th-century Cuban writers
21st-century American women writers